Ancylopus ceylonicus, is a species of handsome fungus beetle found in India, and Sri Lanka.

Aedeagus with falcate apex and thinner ramus. Mesotibia with greater widening. Antennae in both sexes are notably stouter. Articles 4 to 8 are almost wide and long at the apex.

References 

Endomychidae
Insects of Sri Lanka
Insects described in 1974